Valya Samvelyan (born 12 August 1937 – died 3 December 1990) was an Armenian folk singer.

Career 
She initially started her artistic career practicing Soviet samodeyatelnost (amateur song), but afterwards won a competition held by the Yerevan Radio and became a soloist of the Ensemble of Folk Instruments of Public Radio of Armenia.

Some of the most popular songs in her interpretation were "Anushik im quyrik", "Antsar aygus nayelov", "Zov gisher", and "Shorora" by Sayat-Nova, gusan Sheram, Alexey Ekimyan, and others.

She died in a car accident in 1990.

Her son Ara Gevorgyan is the producer of her posthumous "Toghetsir indz menak" ("You left me alone") and "Anushik im quyrik" ("My sweet sister") albums.

References

External links
Valya Samvelyan

1990 deaths
1937 births
20th-century Armenian women singers